Englerodendron usambarense is a species of plant in the family Fabaceae. It is found only in Tanzania.

References

usambarense
Endemic flora of Tanzania
Vulnerable plants
Plants described in 1907
Taxonomy articles created by Polbot